Aviere may refer to:
avian (disambiguation), in French: Avière
airman, in Italian: Aviere